Dillingersville Union School and Church is a historic church and school building located at Lower Milford Township in Lehigh County, Pennsylvania.  It was built in 1885, and is a one-story, rectangular fieldstone building measuring 52 feet by 30 feet.  It has a gable roof topped with a frame bell cupola.  The building ceased use as a school in 1941, and is used as a community museum and educational resource.

It was added to the National Register of Historic Places in 1978.

References

External links

Dillingersville School history

Churches on the National Register of Historic Places in Pennsylvania
Churches completed in 1885
19th-century churches in the United States
Churches in Lehigh County, Pennsylvania
National Register of Historic Places in Lehigh County, Pennsylvania